Jaylen Jerrod Hill (born May 26, 1994) is an American football cornerback who is currently a free agent. He played college football at Jacksonville State.

Professional career
Hill signed with the Baltimore Ravens as an undrafted free agent on May 16, 2017. He made the Ravens' final roster as an undrafted rookie, playing in six games primarily on special teams. He tore his ACL and MCL in Week 16 and was placed on injured reserve on December 26, 2017.

On August 31, 2018, Hill was placed on the physically unable to perform list to start the season while recovering from knee surgery.

On March 19, 2019, Hill was released by the Ravens.

References

External links
Jacksonville State Gamecocks bio
Baltimore Ravens bio

1994 births
Living people
African-American players of American football
Players of American football from Marietta, Georgia
American football cornerbacks
Jacksonville State Gamecocks football players
Baltimore Ravens players
21st-century African-American sportspeople